Dr. Kent E. Carpenter is a professor of biological sciences at Old Dominion University, in Norfolk, Virginia, who is notable for having two fish species named in his honor, Paracheilinus carpenteri Randall and Lubbock 1981, popularly known as "Carpenter's flasher wrasse", and  Meganthias carpenteri Anderson 2006, popularly known as Carpenter's Yellowtop Jewelfish.

Dr. Carpenter earned his Bachelor of Science degree in marine biology at Florida Institute of Technology in 1975 and his Doctor of Philosophy degree in zoology at the University of Hawaii. His research emphasis is in the systematics and evolution of marine fishes. His work in marine biogeography for the Indian Ocean and west Pacific Ocean has led to work in marine conservation and comparative phylogeography using population genetics, with a special interest in the Philippines.

He is also a long-term collaborator with the Food and Agriculture Organization of the United Nations Species Identification and Data Programme for Fisheries, producing identification guides for regions such as the western Pacific and the western and eastern Atlantic Oceans. He has done fieldwork in the Caribbean, West Africa, and the Philippines.  In addition to research and teaching responsibilities, he is also the coordinator for the IUCN Global Marine Species Assessment, completing the first global review of every marine vertebrate species, and of selected marine invertebrates and marine plants, to determine conservation status and possible extinction risk for about 20,000 marine species.

Honoria
The jewelfish Meganthias carpenteri is named after him.

See also
:Category:Taxa named by Kent E. Carpenter

References

Living people
American marine biologists
Florida Institute of Technology alumni
University of Hawaiʻi alumni
Year of birth missing (living people)